Runaway Horses is the third solo studio album by American singer Belinda Carlisle, released on October 3, 1989, by MCA Records. The album features songs written by Rick Nowels, Ellen Shipley, Charlotte Caffey and a song co-written by Carlisle herself. The album contains an array of guest artists, including George Harrison and Bryan Adams.

The album peaked at number 37 on the US Billboard 200, a considerable fall in sales from Carlisle's 1987 album, Heaven on Earth, but reached number four in the United Kingdom, where it was certified Platinum.

Reception and chart performance

In positive review of November 11, 1989, Rob Garner of RPM called this record "a very well packaged group effort." He resumed: "Any one of these chorus-with-a-hook tracks could find play."

AllMusic retrospectively reviewed the album as being not as strong as Heaven on Earth but still generally likeable and appealing. The album made its debut on the Billboard 200 on October 21, 1989, and after seven weeks of slowly moving up the charts reached its peak position of number 37, a lower position than her previous two albums. The album spent a total of 25 weeks on the Billboard 200 and was certified gold by the RIAA. Runaway Horses was Carlisle's last album to chart in the United States.

The album debuted on the UK Albums Chart on November 4, 1989, at number four, which was the album's peak position, matching that of her previous album. The album moved down and back up the chart over the next 18 months and re-entered the top 10 in 1991. Five singles from the album entered the UK Top 40, two of which reached Top 10. The album spent a total of 39 weeks in the UK Top 100 and was certified Platinum by the BPI. Carlisle was presented with her Platinum disc live on the Saturday morning children's television show Going Live! on BBC One.

The album was also a success in Australia; it peaked at number six and was certified double Platinum becoming the 24th best-selling album of 1990.

Six singles were released from Runaway Horses, and were successful in most markets; the album giving Carlisle four more international top ten hits. "Leave a Light On" was the first song released from the album and became a top ten hit around the world including the UK, where it hit number four (and was certified Silver), Australia, where it hit number five, and Canada, where it hit number six. The song narrowly missed the top ten in the United States peaking at number 11. "La Luna" was the second song released from the album and became a top 40 hit in Australia and the UK, also becoming her third top ten in Switzerland. "Summer Rain" was the third song released and became a top ten hit in Australia and a top 30 hit in the US (where it was released as the second single) and the UK (where it was released as the sixth single in December 1990). "Runaway Horses" (the title track) was the fourth single released, but was not as successful as the previous singles, only managing to reach number 40 in the UK. "Vision of You" was the fifth song released and became the lowest-charting single on the album only peaking at number 41 in the UK, and a re-release in 1991 reached 71. The sixth and final song released from the album was "(We Want) The Same Thing", becoming Carlisle's fifth top ten single in the UK. For its single release, "(We Want) The Same Thing" was totally remixed from a heavily accented punk rock staccato mix to a pop song.

Runaway Horses was re-released on August 26, 2013, in a 2CD+DVD casebook edition from Edsel Recording (EDSG 8026) featuring the original album remastered, the single versions, remixes and B-sides. The DVD features the videos from the album and an exclusive interview with Carlisle discussing the album.

Runaway Horses 30th Anniversary Edition was released in 2019 to coincide with her Runaway Horses 30th Anniversary Tour.  This version features the 27 tracks from the 2013 re-release without the DVD, plus three new cover recordings: Gordon Lightfoot's "If You Could Read My Mind", Elton John's "I Need You to Turn To" and Joni Mitchell's "Both Sides Now".  The digital download features all 30 tracks and the Deluxe Edition is a 4LP+CD Box Set.

Track listing

Personnel 
 Belinda Carlisle – lead vocals 
 Charles Judge – keyboards (1-7, 10), acoustic piano (2, 7, 9)
 Jimmie Haskell – accordion (5)
 Sandy Stewart – acoustic piano (8)
 David Munday – keyboards (8), guitars (8), bass (8), drum programming (8)
 Rick Nowels – arrangements (1-10), guitars (1, 9), acoustic guitar (2, 10), electric guitar (2), Spanish guitar (3, 5), keyboards (5)
 Ben Schultz – guitars (1, 7), acoustic guitar (3), 12-string guitar (3)
 George Harrison – slide guitar solo (1), 12-string guitar (7), 6-string bass (7)
 X.Y. Jones – guitars (1, 4, 6-10), electric guitar (2)
 Steve Lukather – guitars (6)
 John Pierce – bass (1-4, 6, 7, 9)
 Eric Pressly – bass (10)
 Rudy Richman – drums (1, 3)
 Luis Conte – Native American drums (2), percussion (2, 10), bongos (3), shaker (3)
 Jorge Black – percussion (2), tom-tom (2), bass (5)
 Kenny Aronoff – drums (6, 7, 9)
 Paul Buckmaster – string arrangements and conductor (4)
 Sid Page – violin (5)
 Bekka Bramlett – backing vocals (1-9)
 Donna De Lory – backing vocals (1-5, 7, 8, 9)
 Ellen Shipley – backing vocals (1, 2, 3, 5, 7, 9)
 Maria Vidal – backing vocals (1-9)
 N'Dea Davenport – backing vocals (3)
 Carmen Twillie – backing vocals (6)
 Mona Lisa Young – backing vocals (6)
 Laura Harding – backing vocals (8)
 Bryan Adams – backing vocals (9)

Production 
 Rick Nowels – producer 
 Laura Harding – production coordination
 Timothy McDaniel – production coordination
 Robert Feist – engineer
 David Leonard – engineer
 Steve MacMillan – engineer, mixing
 Steve Marcantonio – engineer
 Dave Meegan – engineer
 Lawrence Ethan – assistant engineer
 Lori Fumar – assistant engineer
 Scott Symington – assistant engineer
 Mike Tacci – assistant engineer
 Randy Wine – assistant engineer
 Marc DeSisto – mixing
 Shelly Yakus – mixing
 Stephen Marcussen – mastering at Precision Lacquer (Hollywood, CA).
 Norman Moore – art direction, design
 Herb Ritts – photography
 Jeannine Braden – personal assistant

Charts

Weekly charts

Year-end charts

Certifications

References

1989 albums
Albums produced by Rick Nowels
Belinda Carlisle albums
MCA Records albums
Virgin Records albums